The 1986–87 Connecticut Huskies men's basketball team represented the University of Connecticut in the 1986–87 collegiate men's basketball season. The Huskies completed the season with a 9–19 overall record. The Huskies were members of the Big East Conference where they finished with a 3–13 record. The Huskies played their home games at Hugh S. Greer Field House in Storrs, Connecticut, the New Haven Coliseum in New Haven, Connecticut, and the Hartford Civic Center in Hartford, Connecticut, and they were led by first-year head coach Jim Calhoun.

Schedule 

|-
!colspan=12 style=""| Regular Season

|-
!colspan=12 style=""| Big East tournament

Schedule Source:

References 

UConn Huskies men's basketball seasons
Connecticut Huskies
1986 in sports in Connecticut
1987 in sports in Connecticut